The Pac-12 Conference women's basketball tournament, otherwise known as the Pac-12 tournament, is the annual concluding tournament for the NCAA women's college basketball in the Pac-12. After a six-year run at KeyArena in Seattle from 2013 to 2018, the tournament moved to Las Vegas, already the location for the Pac-12 men's tournament, for at least 2019 and 2020, due to the closure of KeyArena for major renovations to accommodate the Seattle Kraken.

Seeding is based on regular season records. The Tournament has been held every year since 2002, when the conference was known as the Pac-10.

On March 5, 2016, the Pac-12 announced that it had agreed to extend its contract to keep the women's tournament in Seattle until 2019. However, the conference ended the contract a season early, moving the women's tournament to Las Vegas for 2019 and 2020 because KeyArena was slated for a major two-year renovation and upgrade. The 2019 tournament was held at MGM Grand Garden Arena, and the 2020 edition was at Mandalay Bay Events Center.

On October 4, 2019, the Pac-12 announced that it has agreed to extend its contract to keep the women's tournament in Las Vegas until 2022.

Champions
Tournament champions receive an automatic bid to the year's NCAA Division I women's basketball tournament.  Numbers in parentheses refer to each team's finish/seed in the tournament for that year.

Notes: * denotes overtime.

Overall Record by team
Source:

Championship game results by team
Source:

Most Outstanding Player by team
Source:

Performance by team
Source:
through 2022 tournament

Key

Coaches with championships 
15 – Tara VanDerveer (Stanford – 2003, 2004, 2005, 2007, 2008, 2009, 2010, 2011, 2012, 2013, 2015, 2017, 2019, 2021, 2022)
2 – Kelly Graves (Oregon – 2018, 2020)
1 – Charli Turner Thorne (Arizona State – 2002)
1 – Scott Rueck (Oregon State – 2016)
1 – Kathy Olivier (UCLA – 2006)
1 – Cynthia Cooper-Dyke (USC – 2014)
1 – Kamie Ethridge (Washington State - 2023)
Note: Coaches with at least one win are listed here. Current coaches are in bold.
Source:

All-time records by seed 

As of March 1, 2023

Source:

Pac-12 Women's Tournament records

Pac-12 Women's Tournament team records
Source:
 Margin of victory: 41 pts., Oregon (vs. California), (81–40), Mar. 5, 2005
 Most points per game: 107 Washington State, (vs. Oregon) (100), Mar. 6, 2014
 Fewest points per game: 31  Arizona vs. Oregon State, Mar. 7, 2008
 Most points per half:  59 Washington State vs. Oregon (55), Mar. 12, 2008 (1st)
 Fewest points per half: 13 Utah vs. Oregon State (32), Mar. 7, 2014; 13 Washington State vs. Arizona State (18), Mar. 7, 2013
 Most points per tournament: 264 Utah,  (4 games) Mar. 2022
 Most field goals per game
 Team: 44 Stanford, (vs. Arizona) (44-of-75), Mar. 11, 2011
 Both Teams: 74,  Washington State (41) vs. Oregon (33), Mar. 6, 2014
 Most field goal attempts per game
 Team: 88, Washington State (vs. Oregon), Mar. 6, 2014 (41-of-88)
 Both Teams, Game: 171, Washington State (88) vs. Oregon (83), Mar. 6, 2014
 Highest Field Goals % per game: 69.0%, California vs. Arizona State, Mar. 4,  2016 (29-of-42)
 Most Assists Per Game: 30, Stanford vs Arizona, Mar. 11, 2011
 Most Steals Per Game: 30, Oregon State (15) vs. Washington (15), Mar. 4, 2005
 Most blocked shots per game: 14, Stanford (8) vs Oregon State (6), Mar. 5, 2017; Colorado (8) vs Washington (6), Mar. 8, 2013; Washington State (9) vs Arizona State (5), Mar. 7, 2013
 Most personal fouls per game (one team): 28, Colorado (vs. Stanford), Mar. 7, 2014
 Highest field goal percentage per game: .690, California vs. Arizona State, Mar. 4,  2016 (29-of-42)
 Lowest field goal percentage per game: .203 Washington State vs. Oregon State, Mar. 3, 2006 (12-of-59)

Pac-12 Tournament individual records
 Most total points scored in:
 Half: 27, Nicole Powell, Stanford vs. Oregon State Mar. 3, 2002 (1st)
 Game: 37, Nicole Powell, Stanford vs. Oregon State Mar. 3, 2002
 Tournament: 75, Lia Galdiera, Washington State, 2014 (3 games)
 Most field goals per :
 Game: 15, Kelsey Plum, Washington vs. Oregon, Mar. 3, 2017 (15-of-33)
 15, Nnemkadi Ogwumike, Stanford vs. Arizona, Mar. 11, 2011 (15-of-22)
 Tournament: 27, Nnemkadi Ogwumike, Stanford, 2011 (3 games)
 Most field goal attempts per:
 Game: 33, Kelsey Plum, Washington vs. Oregon, Mar. 3, 2017 (15-of-33)
 Tournament: 63, Sabrina Ionescu, Oregon, 2019 (22-of-63), 3 games)
 Field goal percentage per:
 Game (min 6 made): 1.000 Jayne Appel, Stanford vs. Oregon State, Mar. 8, 2008 (8-of-8)
 Tournament (min 6 made/2 gms): .778, Sophia Elenga, Arizona State, 2019 (7-of-9, 2 games); .778, Toni Kokenis, Stanford, 2011 (7-of-9, 2 games); .778, Jamie Funn, USC, 2007 (7-of-9, 2 games)
 Game: Most 3-pt. FGs made
 8 Candice Wiggins, Stanford vs. USC, Mar. 4, 2007 (8-of-9)
 Highest 3-pt. FG % (min. 5 made/2 games)
 Game: 1.000, Brynna Maxwell, Utah vs. Washington, Mar. 5, 2020 (5-of-5); 1.000, Lexy Kresl, Colorado vs. Oregon State, Mar. 6, 2015 (5-of-5); 1.000, Kiki Williams, California vs. Oregon, Mar. 5, 2004 (5-of-5)
 Most total rebounds per :
 Game: 27, Chantel, Osahor, Washington vs. Oregon, Mar. 3, 2017
 Tournament: 50, Chiney Ogwumike, Stanford, 2013 (3 games)
 Most steals per :
 Game: 8 Nikki Blue, UCLA vs. Oregon, Mar. 8, 2003
 Tournament: 19, Lisa Willis, UCLA, 2006 (3 games)
 Most blocks per:
 Game: 7, Ruth Hamblin, Oregon State vs. Washington State, Mar. 8, 2014
 Tournament: 18, Ruth Hamblin, Oregon State, 2014 (3 games)

Pac-12 Tournament final game team records
 Most total points scored in a final game: 161 (UCLA 85, Stanford 76 OT) (2006)

See also

 Pac-12 Conference men's basketball tournament

References

External links
 Official website